Johannes Franciscus Vaes (1902 – 1978) was a Belgian mineralogist and geologist associated with the Union Minière du Haut-Katanga, in Belgian Congo, now the Democratic Republic of the Congo.

Vaes discovered the mineral Vaesite, which was named after him in 1945 by Paul F. Kerr.

References

External links 

 Mindat.org – Vaesite
 Webmineral.com – Vaesite
 Handbook of Mineralogy – Vaesite

1902 births
1978 deaths
Belgian mineralogists
Belgian geologists